Jane Altschwager (born 25 August 1980) is a former Australia netball international. During the Commonwealth Bank Trophy era, Altschwager made 81 senior appearances for Adelaide Thunderbirds, Sydney Swifts and Hunter Jaegers. Between 1999 and 2004, she was a member of three premiership winning squads – 1999 with Thunderbirds and 2001 and 2004 with Swifts. During the ANZ Championship era she re-joined Thunderbirds and also played for Central Pulse.
Altschwager captained both Jaegers and Pulse. After retiring as a netball player,  Altschwager went on to play women's Australian rules football for North Adelaide in the SANFL Women's League.

Early life and education
Altschwager was born in Millicent, South Australia.  Between 1995 and 1997 she attended Pembroke School. Between 1999 and 2001  she attended the University of South Australia where she gained a BA in Communications and Advertising.

Netball

South Australia state league
Altschwager played for both Contax and the Australian Institute of Sport in the South Australia state league. In 1999 she made her senior debut for Contax. In 2000 she was a member of the AIS team that finished as runners up to Contax in the grand final. She was also selected in the league's Team of the Year.  In 2011 she returned to the South Australia state league to play for Newton Jaguars.

Commonwealth Bank Trophy
Adelaide Thunderbirds
Between 1999 and 2000, Altschwager was a member of the Adelaide Thunderbirds squad, making 5 senior appearances for the team.

Sydney Swifts
Between 2001 and 2004, Altschwager made 50 senior appearances for Sydney Swifts.  She was a member of the Swifts teams that won premierships in 2001 and 2004. She played for Swifts in the 2001 grand final against Adelaide Thunderbirds, partnering Megan Anderson and scoring 27 from 32 with an 84% success rate. In 2001, while playing for Swifts, she was named the Commonwealth Bank Trophy league's Best New Talent.

Hunter Jaegers
Between 2005 and 2006, Altschwager made 26 senior appearances for Hunter Jaegers. She also captained the team during the 2005 and 2006 seasons.

ANZ Championship
Altschwager came out of retirement to play for Adelaide Thunderbirds in the 2009 ANZ Championship season.  During the 2010 ANZ Championship season she captained Central Pulse. In addition to playing for Pulse, Altschwager also managed the team's website.

Australia
Between 2001 and 2004 Altschwager made 7 senior appearances for Australia. She was a member of the Australia U21 that won a gold medal at the 2000 World Youth Netball Championships. She made her senior debut for Australia on 1 April 2000 during an away game against England. She remained in the Australia squad until 2005.

Australian rules football
In 2018 and 2019, Altschwager played for North Adelaide in the SANFL Women's League.

Employment
Altschwager has worked in various media and communication roles, both during and after her netball career. In 2009, while playing for Adelaide Thunderbirds, she worked as producer for Australia Live TV. She also worked as a netball commentator for ABC Radio and Television.  Between 2011 and 2016 she worked as a game day court announcer for Thunderbirds. Between 2016 and 2017 she worked as a marketing and communications manager for Tennis Australia at the World Tennis Challenge.

Honours
Sydney Swifts
Commonwealth Bank Trophy
Winners: 2001, 2004
Australian Institute of Sport
South Australia State League
Runners Up: 2000

References

1980 births
Living people
Australian netball players
Australia international netball players
Netball players from South Australia
Australian netball commentators
Contax Netball Club players
Australian Institute of Sport netball players
Sydney Swifts players
Hunter Jaegers players
Adelaide Thunderbirds players
Central Pulse players
ANZ Championship players
Australian expatriate netball people in New Zealand
Women's Australian rules footballers
Australian rules footballers from South Australia
Sportspeople from Adelaide
People from Millicent, South Australia
Australian people of German descent
People educated at Pembroke School, Adelaide
University of South Australia alumni
South Australia state netball league players